John Wermer is a mathematician specializing in Complex analysis.

Wermer received his Ph.D. from Harvard University in 1951 under the supervision of George Whitelaw Mackey.

In 1962 Wermer was an invited speaker at the International Congress of Mathematicians in Stockholm.

In 2012, Wermer became a fellow of the American Mathematical Society.

References

Fellows of the American Mathematical Society
Harvard University alumni
Year of birth missing (living people)
Living people